The Otto H. Kahn House is a mansion at 1 East 91st Street, in the Carnegie Hill section of the Upper East Side of Manhattan in New York City. The structure was built between 1914 and 1918 as the town residence of Otto H. Kahn, a German-born financier and philanthropist who owned a palatial estate, Oheka Castle, on Long Island.

Early history 

Kahn, a senior partner at the investment bank Kuhn, Loeb and Co., commissioned the architects J. Armstrong Stenhouse and C. P. H. Gilbert to design a house in the neo-Italian renaissance style. The house was modeled after the palazzo della Cancelleria of the Papal Chancellery in Rome and took four years to construct. It had up to 80 rooms in addition to living quarters for 40 servants, which made it one of the largest private homes in America.

The mansion includes an indoor courtyard, garden, and private driveway, which was guarded 24 hours a day by a doorman, as well as an oak-paneled library and spacious reception room.  Upon its completion, the Architectural Review praised the mansion as "a remarkable example of well-balanced re-adjustment in those aesthetic elements that are found in architecture of the early sixteenth century in Italy" and deemed J. Armstrong Stenhouse to have "achieved a work which ranks as the foremost of its kind in this country." Original photographs of the more formal rooms taken during the Kahns occupancy show them decorated in the 18th century French and Italian style.

Kahn housed an extensive art collection inside the mansion, including tapestries, glass chandeliers, and valuable paintings by Botticelli. Enrico Caruso and George Gershwin were among the Kahn's many famous friends, who were known to often give impromptu performances at the mansion.

Later history 
Following Kahn's death in 1934, the house was sold to the Convent of the Sacred Heart, a private Catholic school for girls.  In 1974., the New York City Landmarks Preservation Commission designated the building a landmark.

See also
List of New York City Designated Landmarks in Manhattan from 59th to 110th Streets

References

Further reading 
 
 Williams, Iain Cameron. The KAHNS of Fifth Avenue, iwp publishing, February 17, 2022,

External links

Homepage of the Otto Kahn Mansion

1918 establishments in New York City
C. P. H. Gilbert buildings
Fifth Avenue
Gilded Age mansions
Houses completed in 1918
Houses in Manhattan
Jews and Judaism in Manhattan
New York City Designated Landmarks in Manhattan
Renaissance Revival architecture in New York City
Upper East Side